Krešimir Bubalo (born 5 November 1973) is a Croatian politician of the HDSSB party, and as of October 2011, Mayor of Osijek, his home city. He graduated in business economics from the University of Josip Juraj Strossmayer. He was elected mayor on 4 June 2009.

References

1973 births
Living people
Mayors of Osijek
University of Osijek alumni
Croatian Democratic Alliance of Slavonia and Baranja politicians